Chris Newman may refer to:
Chris Newman (sound engineer) (born 1940), Academy Award-winning sound mixer and director
Chris Newman (footballer) (born 1982), Australian rules footballer for the Richmond Football Club (AFL)
Chris Newman (artist) (born 1958), composer, author and performance artist
Chris Newman (actor) (born 1987), Irish actor from the show Aisling's Diary
Chris Newman (musician) (born 1953), American songwriter, singer, guitarist, recording artist
Chris Newman (guitarist) (born 1952), British guitarist and songwriter
Chris Newman (field hockey) (born 1990), British field hockey player